Kissack is a surname. Notable people with the surname include:

Eric Kissack (born 1977), American film editor
Keith Kissack (1913–2010), English historian
Wilfred Kissack (1873–1942), Manx Anglican priest

See also
Kissack, an Isle of Man Railway locomotive